Be Still My Soul may refer to:

"Be Still, My Soul" (hymn), a Christian hymn set to Finlandia
Be Still My Soul (Abigail album)
Be Still My Soul (Selah album)